The 6th New York Cavalry Regiment, also known as the 6th Regiment New York Volunteer Cavalry and nicknamed the "2nd Ira Harris Guards", was a cavalry regiment of the Union Army during the American Civil War. The majority of its fighting was in Virginia as part of the Army of the Potomac.

Service
The regiment was organized as the 2nd Ira Harris Guard in New York City between September 12 and December 19, 1861, initially under the special authority of the War Department. Before completing its organization, the regiment was transferred to the state of New York and numbered as the 6th Regiment, New York Volunteer Cavalry on November 20. Thomas Devin, captain of a militia cavalry company, had been appointed colonel of the regiment two days earlier.  

Companies were mustered in as follows: "A" September 12, "B" September 27, "D" September 28, "C" September 29, "E" October 3. "F" and "G" October 24, "H" October 28, "I" November 2, "L" November 6, "K" and "M" December 19, 1861. Left State for York, Pa., December 23, 1861, and duty there till March, 1862. Ordered to Washington, D. C., March, 1862, and duty in the Defences of that city (8 Cos.) till July 23, 1862. (Cos. "D" and "K" served detached with 2nd Army Corps, Army of the Potomac, March, 1862, to July, 1863, and Cos. "F" and "H" served detached with 4th Army Corps March, 1862, to August, 1863, and in the Defences of Washington, D. C., 22nd Army Corps, to October, 1863.) Regiment attached to Military District of Washington, D. C., March to July, 1862. 9th Army Corps, Army of the Potomac, August to December, 1862. 2nd Brigade, Pleasanton's Cavalry Division, Army of the Potomac, to February, 1863. 2nd Brigade, 1st Division, Cavalry Corps, Army of the Potomac and Army of the Shenandoah, Middle Military Division, to July, 1865. (Co. "A" detached with 6th Army Corps, September, 1862. Cos. "B" and "C" with 9th Army Corps, January and February, 1863. Co. "A" with 22nd Army Corps July and August, 1863.

Detailed service

The 6th New York Volunteer Cavalry's detailed service is as follows (NOTE — Battles are Bolded, Italicized; campaigns are Italicized):

1861
 Duty in the Defences of Washington (8 Cos.) till July 23, 1862.

1862

 Siege of Yorktown, Va., April 5-May 4 (Cos. "D" and "K"). 
 Battle of Williamsburg May 5 (Cos. "D" and "K"). 
 Battle of Seven Pines May 31-June 1 (Co. "K"). 
 Seven Days Battles before Richmond June 25-July 1 (Cos. "D," "F," "H," "K"). 
 Battle of Savage's Station June 29. 
 Battle of Glendale June 30. 
 Battle of Malvern Hill July 1. 
 Regiment moved to Warrenton, Va., July 23-26. 
 Scout and outpost duty on the Rapidan and Rappahannock Rivers at Barnett's Ford, Va., July and August. 
 Orange Court House August 14. 
 Culpeper Road August 19. 
 Barnett's Ford August 26. 
 Kelly's Ford August 30. 
 Williamsburg September 9. 
 Near Hyattstown September 9-10. 
 Frederick City September 12. 
 South Mountain September 14. 
 Battle of Antietam September 16-17. 
 Lovettsville October 3. 
 Reconnaissance to Smithville, W. Va., October 16-17. 
 Kearneysville October 16. 
 Charlestown October 16-17. 
 Near Lovettsville October 21. 
 Near Wheatland October 21. 
 Snickersville October 22. 
 Union and Bloomfield November 2-3. 
 Ashby's Gap November 3. 
 Upperville November 3. 
 Waterloo Bridge November 7. 
 Ellis Ford December 1. 
 Battle of Fredericksburg December 12-15. 
 Roconnaissance from Yorktown December 11-15 (Detachment). 
 Matthews County Court House December 12. 
 Buena Vista December 13. 
 Wood's Cross Roads December 14.

1863

 Expedition from Yorktown to West Point and White House (Detachment) January 7-9, 1863 . 
 Pamunkey River January 8. Expedition to Gloucester Court House (Detachment) April 7.
 Fort Magruder (Detachment).  April 11
 Chancellorsville Campaign April 27-May 6. 
 Germania and Richard's Fords April 29. 
 Crook's Run April 29. 
 Spotsylvania Court House April 30. 
 Battle of Chancellorsville May 1-5. 
 West Point (Detachment) May 7. 
 Gettysburg Campaign June 3–July 24
 Warwick River June 5. 
 Brandy Station and Beverly Ford June 9. 
 Upperville June 21. 
 Middleburg June 22. 
 Haymarket June 24-25. 
 Dix's Peninsula Campaign (3rd Battalion) June 24-July 7. 
 Expedition from White House to Bottom's Bridge (3rd Battalion) July 1-7. 
 Crump's or Baltimore Cross Roads (3rd Battalion) July 2. 
 Battle of Gettysburg, Pa., July 1-3. 
 Williamsport July 6. 
 Battle of Boonsboro July 8. 
 Benovola or Beaver Creek, Md., July 9. 
 Battle of Funkstown July 10-13. 
 Falling Waters July 14. 
 Manassas Gap July 21-22. 
 Battle of Manassas Gap July 23. 
 Barbee's Crossroads July 25. 
 Kelly's Ford July 31-August 1. 
 Brandy Station August 1-3. 
 Advance from the Rappahannock to the Rapidan September 13-17. 
 Culpeper Court House September 13. 
 Raccoon Ford September 14-15 and 19. 
 Reconnaissance across the Rapidan September 21-23. 
 Jack's Shop, Madison Court House, September 22. 
 Bristoe Campaign October 9–22. 
 Raccoon and Morton's Fords October 10. 
 Kelly's Ford and Stevensburg October 11. 
 Brandy Station or Fleetwood October 12. 
 Battle of Bristoe Station October 14. 
 Oak Hill October 15. 
 Culpeper October 17-18. 
 Bealeton October 24-26. 
 Advance to line of the Rappahannock November 7-8. 
 Muddy Run November 8. 
 Battle of Mine Run November 26-December 2. 
 Parker's Store November 29.

1864

 Demonstration on the Rapidan February 6-7, 1864. 
 Barnett's Ford February 6-7. 
 Kilpatrick's Raid on Richmond February 28-March 4. 
 Near Taylorstown, Beaver Dam Station, Frederick's Hall and South Anna Bridge February 29. 
 Defences of Richmond March 1. 
 Aylett's March 2. 
 Kings and Queens Court House March 3. 
 Carrollton's Store March 11. 
 Overland Campaign May-June. 
 Battle of the Wilderness May 5-7. 
 Brock Road and The Furnaces May 6. 
 Battle of Todd's Tavern May 7-8. 
 Battle of Spotsylvania Court House May 8. 
 Sheridan's Raid to James River May 9-24. 
 North Anna May 9-10. 
 Ground Squirrel Church and Battle of Yellow Tavern May 11. 
 Fortifications of Richmond and Meadow Bridge May 12. 
 Jones' Bridge May 17. 
 On line of the Pamunkey May 26-28. 
 Crump's Creek and Hanovertown May 27. 
 Battle of Haw's Shop May 28. 
 Battle of Totopotomoy Creek May 28-31. 
 Battle of Old Church May 30. 
 Battle of Cold Harbor May 31-June 6. 
 Bethesda Church May 31-June 1. 
 Sheridan's Trevillian Raid June 7-24. 
 Battle of Trevilian Station June 11-12. 
 Newark or Mallory's Cross Roads June 12.
 Siege of Petersburg  June 15, 1864 – April 2, 1865
 White House or St. Peter's Church June 21. 
 Black Creek or Tunstall's Station June 21. 
 Jones' Bridge June 23. 
 Charles City Court House June 23. 
 Before Petersburg June 26-July 30. 
 First Battle of Deep Bottom July 27-28. 
 Sheridan's Shenandoah Valley Campaign August 7-November 28. 
 Berryville August 10 and 13. 
 Toll Gate near White Post and Newtown August 11. 
 Front Royal August 11. 
 Cedar Creek August 12. 
 Cedarville, Guard Hill or Front Royal and Crooked Run August 16. 
 Charlestown August 21. 
 Kearneyville and near Shephardstown August 25. 
 Leetown and Smithfield August 28. 
 Smithfield Crossing Opequan August 29. 
 Battle of Berryville September 3. 
 Bunker Hill September 13. 
 Sevier's Ford, Opequan Creek, September 15. 
 Third Battle of Winchester September 19. 
 Middletown and Strasburg September 20. 
 Battle of Fisher's Hill September 21. 
 Near Edenburg September 23. 
 Mt. Jackson September 23-24. 
 New Market September 24. 
 Port Republic September 26-27. 
 Waynesboro September 29. 
 Mt. Crawford October 2. 
 Battle of Tom's Brook, "Woodstock Races" October 8-9. 
 Hupp's Hill near Strasburg October 14. 
 Battle of Cedar Creek October 19. 
 Woodstock October 20. 
 Near Kernstown November 11. 
 Newtown November 12. 
 Hood's Hill November 22. 
 Expedition from Winchester into Faquier and Loudoun Counties November 28-December 3. 
 Expedition to Gordonsville December 19-28. 
 Jack's Shop near Gordonsville December 23.

1865

 Siege of Petersburg  June 15, 1864 – April 2, 1865
 Levettsville January 18, 1865. 
 Sheridan's Raid from Winchester February 27-March 25. 
 Waynesboro March 2. 
 Occupation of Staunton March 2. 
 Charlottesville March 3. 
 Goochland Court House March 11. 
 Appomattox Campaign March 28-April 9. 
 Battle of Dinwiddie Court House 30-31. 
 Battle of Five Forks April 1. 
 Fall of Petersburg April 2. 
 Scott's Cross Roads April 2. 
 Deep Creek April 3. 
 Tabernacle Church or Beaver Pond Creek April 4. 
 Battle of Sailor's Creek April 6. 
 Appomattox Station April 8. 
 Appomattox Court House April 9. 
 Surrender of Lee and his army. 
 Expedition to Danville April 23-29. 
 Moved to Washington, D. C., May. 
 Grand Review May 23. 

The regiment was consolidated with the 15th New York Cavalry on June 17 to form the 2nd New York Provisional Cavalry Regiment.

Casualties and losses
Regiment lost during service 9 Officers and 72 Enlisted men killed and mortally wounded and 133 Enlisted men by disease. Total 214.

See also
List of New York Civil War units
New York in the American Civil War

Notes

References

External links
 6th NY Cavalry Regiment - NY Military Museum
 National Park Service – 6th Regiment, New York Cavalry

Cavalry regiments
Cavalry 005
Military units and formations established in 1861
1861 establishments in New York (state)
Military units and formations disestablished in 1865